Regional elections were held in Spain in 2019 to elect the regional parliaments of thirteen of the seventeen autonomous communities—Aragon, Asturias, the Balearic Islands, the Canary Islands, Cantabria, Castile and León, Castilla–La Mancha, Extremadura, La Rioja, Madrid, Murcia, Navarre and the Valencian Community. 814 of 1,208 seats in the regional parliaments were up for election, as well as the 50 seats in the regional assemblies of Ceuta and Melilla. The elections were held simultaneously with local elections all throughout Spain, as well as the 2019 European Parliament election.

Election date
Determination of election day varied depending on the autonomous community, with each one having competency to establish its own regulations. Typically, thirteen out of the seventeen autonomous communities—all but Andalusia, the Basque Country, Catalonia and Galicia—had their elections fixed for the fourth Sunday of May every four years, to be held together with nationwide local elections.

In some cases, regional presidents had the prerogative to dissolve the regional parliament and call for extra elections at a different time, but newly elected assemblies were restricted to serving out what remained of their previous four year-terms without altering the period to their next ordinary election. In other cases—namely, Aragon, the Balearic Islands, Castile and León, Extremadura, Navarre and the Valencian Community—, the law granted presidents the power to call a snap election resulting in fresh four year-parliamentary terms. By the time of the 2019 regional elections, this prerogative had been exercised by the Valencian Community by holding a snap regional election on 28 April 2019.

Regional governments
The following table lists party control in autonomous communities and cities. Gains for a party are highlighted in that party's colour.

Overall results

Summary by region

Aragon

Asturias

Balearic Islands

Canary Islands

Cantabria

Castile and León

Castilla–La Mancha

Extremadura

La Rioja

Madrid

Murcia

Navarre

Valencian Community

Autonomous cities

Ceuta

Melilla

References

External links
www.juntaelectoralcentral.es (in Spanish). Central Electoral Commission – Regional elections
www.argos.gva.es (in Spanish). Argos Information Portal – Electoral Historical Archive
www.historiaelectoral.com (in Spanish and Catalan). Electoral History – Regional elections since 1980

2019
 
May 2019 events in Spain